Endonuclease/Exonuclease/phosphatase family is a structural domain found in the large family of proteins including magnesium dependent endonucleases and many phosphatases involved in intracellular signaling.

Examples
AP endonuclease proteins ,
DNase I proteins ,
Synaptojanin, an inositol-1,4,5-trisphosphate phosphatase 
Sphingomyelinase 
Nocturnin, an NADPH 2' phosphatase

Subfamilies
Inositol polyphosphate related phosphatase

Human proteins containing this domain 
2'-PDE;    2-PDE;     ANGEL1;    ANGEL2;    APEX1;     APEX2;     CCRN4L;    CNOT6;
CNOT6L;    DNASE1;    DNASE1L1;  DNASE1L2;  DNASE1L3;  INPP5A;    INPP5B;    INPP5D;
INPP5E;    INPPL1;    KIAA1706;  OCRL;      PIB5PA;    SKIP;      SMPD2;     SMPD3;
SYNJ1;     SYNJ2;     TTRAP;     Nocturnin;

Notes

References

Protein domains
Peripheral membrane proteins
EC 3.1.3